Jolyon Carlyle Palmer (born 20 January 1991) is a British motorsport commentator and columnist, covering the Formula One World Championship on BBC Radio 5 and F1TV. Prior to his media career, Palmer was a racing driver and the 2014 GP2 Series champion. Palmer drove for Renault Sport F1 Team in Formula One.

Palmer, the son of former F1 driver and major UK race circuit owner Jonathan Palmer, was educated at Dorset House School, after which he attended Cranleigh School and the University of Nottingham (from which he graduated with a bachelor's degree in Management Studies in 2012). He drove for the Lotus Formula One team as a test driver in 2015, stepping up to a full-time race seat the following season when the team received manufacturer backing from Renault.

After ending his driving career, Palmer became an F1 analyst for BBC and the F1 app alongside Jack Nicholls. He is a regular columnist on the BBC Sport website and is also a special contributor to the official F1 website, offering detailed analysis on racing incidents following each Grand Prix.

Career

T Cars (2005–2007)
Having spent 2004 racing in MiniMax karts, Palmer moved up to cars in 2005 and specifically the T Cars championship's Autumn Trophy – a racing series for drivers between the ages of 14 and 17. Palmer finished fifth in that championship, with a grand total of 92 points, 46 behind championship winner Adrian Quaife-Hobbs. He moved up to the main championship in 2006, earning one pole position and four podiums, and again finished fifth in the championship with 101 points, 69 behind champion Luciano Bacheta. Palmer also took part in a second Autumn Trophy, winning four of the six races. He took part in two races of the 2007 season, winning both but decided to concentrate on Formula Palmer Audi.

Formula Palmer Audi (2007–2008)
In 2007, Palmer moved to the series which his father, Jonathan, created nine years before. He finished 12th on debut at Silverstone, and his results gradually improved with him taking two wins (one at Brands Hatch and one at Oulton Park) and two pole positions at Brands, on his way to tenth in the championship. He missed the final two rounds of the championship, due to an abdominal injury suffered in a quad bike accident at his home in West Sussex, in which he nearly died as he lost a kidney, punctured a lung, suffered liver damage and lost a lot of blood.

He recovered in time for the start of the 2008 season, in which he was a championship challenger right up until the last few races of the season. Palmer secured one win (at the overseas race at Spa) and 11 podiums along with three pole positions and ended up just 22 points behind Jason Moore, in third place. The Autumn Trophy and the FPA Shootout also brought third places for Palmer, taking three podiums from the six races.

FIA Formula Two (2009–2010)
2009 saw Palmer move up to the FIA Formula Two Championship, driving car number three. His best result was a sixth-place finish at Imola. Palmer picked up one fifth-place finish in the next round at Marrakech, but bounced back to take both wins and the championship lead in the third round at Monza. He eventually finished 2nd behind fellow Briton Dean Stoneman.

Palmer made a one-off return to F2 during the 2011 season at the Nürburgring, but was a non-starter in both races.

GP2 Series (2011–2014)

2011 season

Palmer made his GP2 Series main season debut in 2011, driving for the Arden International team alongside Josef Král. He scored a top ten finish on his debut weekend at Abu Dhabi and more top ten finishes followed at Istanbul and Valencia. A move to the Barwa Addax team for the non-championship GP2 Finals saw a breakthrough on his return to Abu Dhabi, with third and fourth places to end his debut year in the category on a high.

2012 season

For the 2012 season, Palmer switched to the iSport International team, alongside Marcus Ericsson. Despite topping the first practice session of the year in Malaysia, persistent electrical problems blighted the early part of his season, precipitating a change of chassis. Results immediately improved and a sixth place at Monaco was followed by his maiden GP2 victory in the sprint race there. Next came a podium position at Silverstone, putting Palmer into the top ten of the leaderboard as the season entered its second half, although he ultimately slipped to 11th despite another podium finish at Monza.

2013 season

For the 2013 GP2 Series Palmer drove for Carlin, partnering Brazilian 2011 British F3 Champion Felipe Nasr. He scored his first win of the year in the Feature Race at the Hungaroring and took pole, fastest lap and the Feature Race win on the streets of Singapore, ending 13 seconds ahead of team-mate Nasr. Palmer qualified in the top three in each of the final three events and finished 7th overall in the points table.

2014 season
Palmer switched to DAMS for the 2014 GP2 Series and topped the opening day of pre-season testing at Abu Dhabi. He qualified on pole for the first race of the season in Bahrain and finished on the podium. He won the Sprint Race the following day to lead the championship, a lead he held for the rest of the year and added another win in the feature race at Monaco.
At Hungary he prevailed in wheel-to-wheel contests with Felipe Nasr in both races, and tensions boiled over during the Sprint Race podium ceremony.

At Monza, Palmer was forced to start at the back of the grid for the Feature Race, after his DAMS car was found to have less than the mandatory one litre of fuel remaining, having originally qualified fourth. Despite this, he finished eighth in the Feature Race, securing reverse grid pole for the Sprint Race, which he won to further extend his championship lead.

Palmer clinched the championship at the first possible attempt, with a fourth win of the year at the new Sochi circuit in Russia. He won the title with three races to spare, and achieved an all-time points record in the series.

Speaking just after clinching the title he said:It wasn't going to be easy to win the championship this weekend, especially today after missing out on pole yesterday. I can't thank the team enough, they've done an incredible job all year, we've been fighting for pretty much every Feature Race win and every pole with almost no mistakes. It feels amazing to be champion!<p>The pressure is off us now and we've got another race tomorrow and another round at Abu Dhabi. We can go out now, enjoy it and have some fun!<p>Looking through the list of previous GP2 Champions, they're all unbelievable drivers, and to be on that list is something which can't be taken away from me, it's an incredible feeling.

On 19 November it was announced that Palmer would drive for the Sahara Force India F1 team at the Abu Dhabi post-season test on 25 November.

Formula One

Force India (2014)
Palmer test drove a Force India car at the end of season test at Abu Dhabi's Yas Marina Circuit on 25 November 2014.

Lotus (2015)

On 20 January 2015 it was announced that Palmer had signed as test and reserve driver for the Lotus F1 Formula One team for 2015. With 2010 GP2 champion Pastor Maldonado and 2011 GP2 champion Romain Grosjean as their official drivers.

Palmer made his debut in the team's 2015 challenger, the E23 Hybrid, on day two of the official pre-season test in Barcelona. Completing 77 laps, he ran a programme focused on data gathering and development work. He finished the day in eighth place. Lotus F1 Team's Trackside Operations Director Alan Permane said: "Today was about data accumulation and Jolyon did a great job in his first time in the car, especially with the particularly cold conditions to start the session in the morning."

He went on to make his Formula One debut on a Grand Prix weekend as he took to the track in Free Practice One at the third round of the 2015 season in China. Palmer completed a packed schedule of aerodynamic and set-up work to finish in 15th place overall on his first visit to the Shanghai circuit.

In his next outing at the Bahrain International Circuit, Palmer ended the session in 14th position, 0.441s shy of teammate Pastor Maldonado. He drove in Free Practice One at the Spanish Grand Prix, recording the 13th fastest time and finishing ahead of Maldonado, before topping the timesheets on the second day of the in-season test in Barcelona on Wednesday 13 May. On 11 June 2015 it was announced that he would drive in Free Practice 1 for the rest of the European season, a total of 5 Grands Prix, which would take him from Austria to Italy, replacing Frenchman Romain Grosjean.

He continued in FP1 in both Austria and Britain, his home Grand Prix, to finish in 14th position before suffering from limited running in Hungary. Palmer tested a new front-wing for Lotus F1 Team in the next Free Practice One session at Spa-Francorchamps, as Romain Grosjean came home third in the Belgian Grand Prix that weekend. Palmer took part in several further sessions, his final appearance in the Lotus E23 coming at the Abu Dhabi season closer, where technical issues limited him to just 10 minutes' running.

Renault (2016–2017)

2016
On 23 October 2015 it was announced that Palmer would be promoted to full Race Driver for the Renault Sport F1 Team in 2016, and became first driver from FIA Formula Two Championship alumni to progress to the Formula One team. He was joined by ex-McLaren driver Kevin Magnussen for Renault's return to the sport as a constructor, having bought the Lotus F1 Team over the winter. At his debut event in the Australian Grand Prix Palmer outqualified Magnussen to the 14th grid position, and after a good start finished the race 11th ahead of his teammate, just outside the point scoring positions.

A car issue in the next races in Bahrain and China prevented Palmer from showing his true form but he bounced back in the Russian Grand Prix, finishing a strong 13th having started 18th on the grid. He repeated that result in the Spanish Grand Prix, coming home ahead of team-mate Magnussen. After an early exit in Monaco, a water leak put paid to his race in Canada before he finished the European Grand Prix in Baku, Azerbaijan, in a creditable 15th.

Palmer recorded his best result since the season-opening Australian Grand Prix as he came home in 12th in Austria before competing in his maiden home Grand Prix at Silverstone. That ended in disappointment as he suffered a suspected gearbox problem which led to his retirement on lap 38, but he produced a career-best drive next time out in the Hungarian Grand Prix as he narrowly missed out on a maiden points scoring finish in Formula 1, finishing 12th. An opening lap clash ended his German Grand Prix before he led the Renault charge at Spa-Francorchamps in the Belgian Grand Prix, coming home in 15th. Palmer's Italian Grand Prix came to a premature end as he once again led the way for the French manufacturer, as Sauber's Felipe Nasr hit the Brit and eventually forced his retirement from the race on safety grounds.

At the Malaysian Grand Prix, Palmer had his best result to date and claimed his first World Championship point. He finished 10th, 14 seconds behind Jenson Button's McLaren and three seconds ahead of Carlos Sainz in a Toro Rosso.
On 9 November 2016 it was announced Palmer had extended his deal with Renault for 2017.

2017

Palmer remained with Renault Sport F1 Team for the start of the 2017 F1 season, where he was accompanied by a new team-mate in Nico Hülkenberg, replacing the departing Kevin Magnussen.

Renault unveiled its brand new R.S.17 at a special launch event in London on 22 January, in a yellow and black livery, adorned with Jolyon's signature race number, 30.

Palmer made his first public appearance behind the wheel of the R.S.17 at the Circuit de Barcelona-Catalunya in Spain in late February, ending the week with the third fastest time on the final day, behind only the Ferrari of Kimi Räikkönen and the Red Bull of Max Verstappen. On the day after he learned that he would be losing his seat for 2018, he survived a race of attrition at the 2017 Singapore Grand Prix to gain a career best finish of sixth, securing his first points of the season.

On 7 October 2017, it was announced that Palmer would leave Renault after the end of the Japanese Grand Prix, to be replaced by Toro Rosso driver Carlos Sainz Jr., taking his seat from the United States Grand Prix onwards.

Media career after Formula One (2018) 
On 22 February 2018, it was announced that Palmer would complete the BBC Radio 5's Formula One staff alongside Jack Nicholls and Jennie Gow, as an expert. Jolyon has earned considerable praise for his knowledge and delivery, offering strong opinions and a unique insight into modern Formula One.

Palmer offers further insight and analysis from the point of view of the competitor with his regular post-Grand Prix column on the BBC website. He is also a Special Contributor to www.formula1.com, analysing racing incidents using all available camera angles. Palmer has appeared as a guest presenter alongside Will Buxton on F1 Live, Liberty Media's post-race paddock show that is available free across the world on social media.

Palmer has also written for Sky Sports F1, with a GP2 Diary posted after each event during his time in the series. He was the regular co-commentator for the GP2 Series on Sky Sports F1 in 2015, and previously commentated alongside future BBC partner Jack Nicholls on the FIA Formula Two Championship.

It was revealed in February 2020 that Palmer would provide expert analysis on the pre-season testing in Barcelona, ahead of the 2020 F1 season.

Other racing activities

Following his GP2 success, Palmer was invited to take part in the 2014 Race of Champions held at the Bushy Park circuit in Barbados. Palmer competed in the Race of Champions Nations Cup event for Team Young Stars, with DTM race-winner Pascal Wehrlein as his team-mate. The pair narrowly missed out on progressing from the group stages, with Palmer losing in close races to Robby Gordon and nine-time Le Mans winner Tom Kristensen but defeating European F3 Champion Esteban Ocon.

In the actual Race of Champions event, Palmer lost to Tom Kristensen, Pascal Wehrlein and Indianapolis 500 winner Ryan Hunter-Reay.

Palmer returned to compete in the 2015 Race of Champions on home soil at the Olympic Stadium in London as part of the Young Stars pairing, once again racing alongside Pascal Wehrlein. The duo were beaten in the quarter finals by England's touring car drivers Andy Priaulx and Jason Plato, before Palmer was edged out by GT racer Alex Buncombe in the individual competition.

Awards

On 4 December 2014, Palmer was announced as the winner of the Guild of Motoring Writers Driver of the Year Award at a prize gala in London. Each year, the trophy is awarded to the leading driver as chosen by a panel of leading motorsport journalists. Previous winners have included Juan Manuel Fangio, Jim Clark and Michael Schumacher.

Palmer was nominated for the Autosport Awards British Competition Driver of the Year in 2014, losing out to Formula One World Champion Lewis Hamilton.

He collected the British Racing Drivers' Club's Fairfield Trophy in 2014, which is awarded to a BRDC member for outstanding performance throughout the year. The ceremony was attended by Lewis Hamilton, 1996 World Champion Damon Hill and BRDC president Derek Warwick.

Personal life
Palmer is the son of former F1 driver and major UK race circuit owner Jonathan Palmer. His younger brother, Will, won the 2015 British BRDC Formula 4 Championship and the prestigious 2015 McLaren Autosport BRDC Award.

Palmer is a supporter of Ipswich Town F.C. and Crystal Palace F.C.

Racing record

Career summary

Complete FIA Formula Two Championship results
(key) (Races in bold indicate pole position) (Races in italics indicate fastest lap)

Complete GP2 Series results
(key) (Races in bold indicate pole position) (Races in italics indicate fastest lap)

Complete GP2 Asia Series results
(key) (Races in bold indicate pole position) (Races in italics indicate fastest lap)

Complete GP2 Final results
(key) (Races in bold indicate pole position) (Races in italics indicate fastest lap)

Complete Formula One results
(key) (Races in bold indicate pole position; races in italics indicate fastest lap)

 – Was entered as third driver, but did not run due to bad weather.

References

External links

 
 

1991 births
Living people
People educated at Cranleigh School
People from Horsham
English racing drivers
Formula Palmer Audi drivers
FIA Formula Two Championship drivers
GP2 Asia Series drivers
GP2 Series drivers
GP2 Series Champions
Renault Formula One drivers
Alumni of the University of Nottingham
English Formula One drivers
Arden International drivers
Campos Racing drivers
ISport International drivers
DAMS drivers
Carlin racing drivers